The rowing competitions at the 2016 Summer Olympics in Rio de Janeiro took place from 6 to 13 August 2016 at the Rodrigo de Freitas Lagoon in Lagoa. Fourteen medal events were being contested by 547 athletes, 334 men and 213 women.

For the third Olympics in a row, Great Britain was the most successful nation, topping the medal table with three golds and two silvers. Germany and New Zealand finished equal in second place with two golds and one silver each.

Competition format 
There were eight events for men and six for women. Events included categories for open weight and restricted weight (lightweight) athletes, and two styles of rowing: sweep, where competitors each use a single oar, and sculling, where they used two.

Sculling events included men's and women's singles, doubles, lightweight doubles, and quads. Sweep events were men's and women's pairs and eights, and men's fours and lightweight fours.

Although the size and composition of the 14 Olympic classes remained unchanged from the 2012 format, the number of boats for men had been reduced in the single sculls, quadruple sculls, and eight, spurring a change towards an increased proportion of boats for women in the single sculls, pair, double sculls, and lightweight double sculls.

Qualification

Each competing nation might qualify one boat for each of the fourteen events. The majority of the qualifying places were awarded based on the results at the 2015 World Rowing Championships, held at Lac d'Aiguebelette, France from August 30 to September 4, 2015. Places are awarded to National Olympic Committees, not to specific athletes, finishing in the top 9 in the single sculls (both men and women), top 5 in the eights, and top 11 in the pairs, doubles, and lightweight doubles, and (only for men) in the coxless four and lightweight four. In the quadruple sculls, the first eight nations will be qualified in the men's event, and the first five in the women's. Further berths were distributed to the nations (and in this case to specific competitors) at four continental qualifying regattas in Asia and Oceania (except for Australia and New Zealand), Africa, Latin America, and Europe (with the additional participation of the United States, Canada, Australia, and New Zealand), and at a final Olympic qualification regatta in Lucerne, Switzerland.

Schedule
After the first day of the competition, many rowers voiced their frustration about the rough conditions on the water. New Zealand rowers Emma Twigg and Mahé Drysdale talked about the regatta being about "survival rather than skill", and Rowing New Zealand lodged an official complaint with the organisers for not postponing the first day when conditions became "unrowable". With the water even more choppy at the start of the second day, that day's rowing was postponed.

Participation

Participating nations (number of rowers)

Competitors

Medal summary

Medal table

Men's events

Women's events

See also
Rowing at the 2016 Summer Paralympics

References

External links

 
 
 International Rowing Federation
 NBC Olympics: Rowing
 Results Book – Rowing

 
2016 Summer Olympics events
Olympics
2016
Rowing competitions in Brazil